The 2018–19 Butler Bulldogs men's basketball team represented Butler University in the 2018–19 NCAA Division I men's basketball season. They were coached by LaVall Jordan, in his second year as head coach of his alma mater. The Bulldogs played their home games at Hinkle Fieldhouse in Indianapolis, Indiana as members of the Big East Conference. They finished the season 16–17, 7–11 in Big East play which tied them for eighth place. As the No. 9 seed in the Big East tournament, they were defeated by Providence in the quarterfinals. The Bulldogs received an at-large bid to the NIT as the No. 5 seed in the TCU bracket. There they were defeated in the first round by Nebraska to end the season.

Previous season 
The Bulldogs finished the 2017–18 season 21–14, 9–9 in Big East play to finish a tie for sixth place. As the No. 6 seed in the Big East tournament, they defeated Seton Hall before losing to Villanova in the semifinals. They received an at-large bid to the NCAA tournament as the No. 10 seed in the Midwest region. There they defeated Arkansas in the first round before losing to Purdue in the second round.

Offseason

Departures

2018 recruiting class

Incoming transfers

Roster

Schedule and results
 
|-
!colspan=12 style=|Exhibition

|-
!colspan=12 style=| Non-conference regular season

|-
!colspan=9 style=|Big East regular season

|-
!colspan=9 style="|Big East tournament

|-
!colspan=9 style=|NIT

Rankings

*AP does not release post-NCAA tournament rankings^Coaches did not release a Week 1 poll.

Awards

See also
2018–19 Butler Bulldogs women's basketball team

References

Butler
Butler Bulldogs men's basketball seasons
Butler
Butler
Butler